(born November 29, 1973) is a Japanese professional wrestler and retired mixed martial artist currently working for Pro Wrestling Noah. Murakami is best known for his work in New Japan Pro-Wrestling (NJPW) during the late 1990s and early 2000s, where he primarily competed as a member of the villainous Makai Club stable. Aside from pro wrestling, Murakami was also part of the first fight in PRIDE history, defeating John Dixson by submission in 1997.

After leaving NJPW in the fall of 2004, Murakami subsequently competed for Pro Wrestling ZERO1-MAX (ZERO1-MAX) and Big Mouth LOUD, of which he was a founding member. Murakami has also made sporadic appearances in Dramatic Dream Team (DDT), Pro Wrestling Noah (Noah) and Chō Sentō Puroresu FMW (FMW).

Mixed martial arts career
Trained in Judo and Sumo since high school, Kazunari became a member of the judo team in Takushoku University. He met Wajyutsu Keishukai founder Yoshinori Nishi, who convinced him to join his team, and Murakami started his career in mixed martial arts.

Murakami began his career fighting for the Lumax Cup: Tournament of J '95 on October 13, 1995 where he lost his first fight to Akihiro Gono by knockout. A few months later, on March 30, 1996, Murakami fought at the Lumax Cup: Tournament of J '96. He fared better, defeating Isamu Osugi by submission and avenging his loss to Gono by decision, but lost to Masanori Suda by submission. In late 1996, Murakami then began fighting for Extreme Fighting where he defeated Bart Vale At EF3: Extreme Fighting 3 on October 18, 1996 by TKO. A few months later, at EF4: Extreme Fighting 4 on March 28, 1997, Murakami lost to future UFC Heavyweight Champion Maurice Smith by KO.

On October 11, 1997, Murakami made history by joining the newly formed PRIDE Fighting Championships and won in the company's first fight by defeating John Dixson at PRIDE 1. He returned to PRIDE three years later at PRIDE 10 on August 27, 2000, where he lost to Masaaki Satake by TKO. He returned to fighting two years later at UFO: Legend in a losing effort to Wallid Ismail by TKO. He last fight was at Jungle Fight 1 on September 13, 2003, where he defeated Lee Young Gun by verbal submission ending his MMA career at 5-5.

Professional wrestling career

New Japan Pro-Wrestling (1999–2004) 
Murakami entered professional wrestling in 1998 when he joined Antonio Inoki's Universal Fighting-Arts Organization alongside fellow judoka Naoya Ogawa. They were sent to New Japan Pro-Wrestling, where Murakami initially gained fame for attacking wrestlers while sporting a white mask, becoming known as "The Terrorist of Heisei". During his early career, Murakami split his time between NJPW and shoot-style promotion Battlarts to hone his skills as a wrestler. One of his first matches was at Wrestling World 2000, teaming with Ogawa in a losing effort to Shinya Hashimoto and Takashi Iizuka when he submitted to Iizuka. On April 7, Murakami took on Iizuka in an attempt to avenge his loss but he once again fell to Iizuka by submission. On May 5 at Wrestling Dontaku 2000, Murakami teamed with Ogawa to challenge Fighting Club G-Eggs (Yuji Nagata and Manabu Nakanishi) for the IWGP Tag Team Championship but lost when Murakami was pinned by Nagata.

In early 2001, Murakami would also wrestle several times for the newborn Pro Wrestling ZERO1, main eventing the promotion's second ever show where he and Ogawa lost to Mitsuharu Misawa and Takeshi Rikio. Murakami became known for his wild, seemingly uncontrollable style of wrestling, predominately made up of punches, kicks, and legitimate judo/MMA throws and submissions, with very little actual wrestling moves in his moveset. In August 2001, Murakami entered the 2001 G1 Climax, his first time ever competing in the tournament. He finished fourth in his block with 5 points scoring victories over Nakanishi and Tadao Yasuda while going to a double countout with eventual winner, Yuji Nagata.

In early 2002, Murakami joined NJPW full time, and in the summer, Murakami joined the heel stable Makai Club, where he was considered one of the highest ranking members behind only Tadao Yasuda. On December 10, 2002, Murakami challenged Yuji Nagata for the IWGP Heavyweight Championship. Despite making Nagata bleed and trapping him in his own finishing move, the Nagata Lock II, Murakami was defeated by Nagata.

At Wrestling World 2003, Murakami and Yasuda lost to Michiyoshi Ohara and Shinsuke Nakamura. The following month, Murakami teamed with Yasuda in a #1 Contenders Tournament for the IWGP Tag Team Championship, making it to the finals before losing to Mike Barton and Jim Steele. However, an injury to Steele would give the title shot to Murakami and Yasuda who unsuccessfully challenged Cho-Ten on February 16. Throughout much of 2003, Murakami and the rest of the Makai Club feuded with Michiyoshi Ohara's Crazy Dogs faction, and in March 2003, MMA fighter Enson Inoue was bought into New Japan to feud with Murakami. On May 2 at NJPW Ultimate Crush 2003, Murakami lost to Inoue in an extremely bloody match that ended in just 6 minutes. In the fall of 2003, Murakami began competing in a series of three "bounty" matches, where the winner would receive a cash prize from Makai Club leader Kantaro Hoshino. He defeated Shinya Makabe at Road to Ultimate Crush on September 21 in a 1,000,000 Yen Bounty match, then fellow Makai Club member Katsuyori Shibata at Ultimate Crush II on October 13 in a 2,000,000 Yen Bounty match, and finally Koji Kanemoto at Yokohama Dead Out on November 3 in a 4,000,000 Bounty match. In early 2004, Murakami began feuding with Hiroshi Tanahashi for the IWGP U-30 Openweight Championship, which eventually led to an empty arena steel cage match on March 28 at King of Sports, won by Tanahashi. On May 3, 2004 at Nexxess in the Tokyo Dome, Murakami teamed with Masahiro Chono to unsuccessfully challenge Yoshihiro Takayama and Minoru Suzuki for the IWGP Tag Team Championship. Makai Club broke up in the summer of 2004 and Murakami would briefly join Masahiro Chono's Black New Japan  stable before leaving New Japan shortly after. His last match under contract to the promotion took place on July 7, where he, Katsuyori Shibata, Super Strong Machine, Mitsuya Nagai and Masahiro Chono defeated Hiroyoshi Tenzan, Osamu Nishimura, Shinya Makabe, Yuji Nagata and Yutaka Yoshie. Murakami would return to New Japan for a one off match at the 2006 Tokyo Dome show, losing to Yuji Nagata.

Big Mouth Loud (2005–2006) 
Having both left New Japan, Murakami and Katsuyori Shibata announced the formation of a new promotion, Big Mouth Loud in January 2005. Backed by Fumihiko Uwai, the promotion was set to focus largely on shoot-style, and would use talent from other promotions as well as their own contracted wrestlers. At Big Mouth Loud's first show in September 2005, Murakami defeated Shibata in the main event. Murakami reignited his feud with Enson Inoue at the next show in December 2005, defeating him in a singles match. Murakami continued to compete for BML until the promotion's closure in mid-2006.

Freelance (2006–2007) 

After Big Mouth Loud folded, Murakami went freelance and began working for Pro Wrestling Zero1 in the summer of 2006. Murakami took part in ZERO1's 2006 Fire Festival tournament, making it to the semi finals before losing to Shinjiro Otani. He also debuted for Pro Wrestling Noah, taking part in a tournament for the GHC Tag Team Championship alongside Shinjiro Otani. They reached the semi-finals before losing to eventual winners Takeshi Morishima and Muhammad Yone. Murakami was also pinned by Mitsuharu Misawa in their only singles match in October. In the first match of the 2007 Fire Festival, Murakami suffered a severe brain injury against Shinjiro Otani, which forced him to leave professional wrestling effective immediately to undergo brain surgery.

Return (2010–2014) 
In February 2010 Murakami returned to pro wrestling, as Big Murakami, losing to Kensuke Sasaki in a match for Sasaki's Kensuke Office promotion. He also returned to Pro Wrestling Noah, and on March 26 teamed with Katsumi Usuda to challenge Takeshi Rikio and Muhammad Yone for the GHC Tag Team Titles but they came up short. Murakami later announced it as his home promotion, and continued to compete with the promotion until its closure in 2014.

Return in Noah (2020–) 
On December 26 at Kongoh Produce ~ Diamond 3 Murakami made his return in Pro Wrestling Noah as NOSAWA Rongai announced his return to the company. On December 29 at Takashi Sugiura 20th Anniversary Show he fought in a 7 vs 7 match and his team, Takashi Sugiura, Kazushi Sakuraba, Kendo Kashin, NOSAWA Rongai, Kaz Hayashi, Daisuke Nakamura won by defeating the whole Kongoh lead by Kenoh. On January 4, 2021 at Noah New Sunrise 2021 Sugiura-gun (Kazunari Murakami, Kazushi Sakuraba & Takashi Sugiura) defeat Kongoh (Katsuhiko Nakajima, Kenou & Masa Kitamiya) by referee's decision. On January 16, 2021, at Noah Higher Ground 2021 - Day 2 in another six-men tag team match Sugiura-gun (NOSAWA Rongai & Takashi Sugiura & Kazunari Murakami) defeat Kongo (Kenou, Manabu Soya & Tadasuke). By defeating three times in a row the Kongoh stable Murakami earned a title match against Kenou for the GHC National Title. On January 23, 2021 at the Noah Higher Ground 2021 - Day 3 show held at the EDION Arena Osaka Kenou retained the title.

Mixed martial arts record

|-
|Win
|align=center|5–5
| Lee Young Gun
| Submission (armbar)
| Jungle Fight 1
| 
|align=center| 1
|align=center| 1:09
|Manaus, Amazonas, Brazil
|
|-
|Loss
|align=center|4–5
| Wallid Ismail
| TKO (punches)
| UFO: Legend
| 
|align=center| 2
|align=center| 3:03
|Tokyo, Japan
|
|-
|Loss
|align=center|4–4
| Masaaki Satake
| TKO (punches)
| PRIDE 10
| 
|align=center| 1
|align=center| 6:58
|Tokorozawa, Saitama, Japan
|
|-
|Win
|align=center|4–3
| John Dixson
| Submission (armbar)
| PRIDE 1
| 
|align=center| 1
|align=center| 1:34
|Tokyo, Japan
|
|-
|Loss
|align=center|3–3
| Maurice Smith
| KO (punch)
| Extreme Fighting 4
| 
|align=center| 1
|align=center| 4:23
|Des Moines, Iowa, United States
|
|-
|Win
|align=center|3–2
| Bart Vale
| TKO (punches)
| Extreme Fighting 3
| 
|align=center| 1
|align=center| 4:37
|Tulsa, Oklahoma, United States
|
|-
|Loss
|align=center|2–2
| Masanori Suda
| Submission (armbar)
| Lumax Cup: Tournament of J '96
| 
|align=center| 2
|align=center| 1:38
|Japan
|
|-
|Win
|align=center|2–1
| Akihiro Gono
| Decision
| Lumax Cup: Tournament of J '96
| 
|align=center| 2
|align=center| 3:00
|Japan
|
|-
|Win
|align=center|1–1
| Isamu Osugi
| Submission (armlock)
| Lumax Cup: Tournament of J '96
| 
|align=center| 1
|align=center| 4:10
|Japan
|
|-
|Loss
|align=center|0–1
| Akihiro Gono
| KO (head kick)
| Lumax Cup: Tournament of J '95
| 
|align=center| 1
|align=center| 2:25
|Japan
|

Kickboxing record

|-
|
|Loss
| Stefan Leko
|Inoki Bom-Ba-Ye 2003
|Kobe, Japan
|KO (right high kick)
| style="text-align:center;"|1
| style="text-align:center;"|1:08
|0–1
|-
| colspan=9 | Legend:

References

External links

Kazunari Murakami at Cagematch
Kazunari Murakami Noah profile

1973 births
Living people
Japanese male mixed martial artists
Heavyweight mixed martial artists
Mixed martial artists utilizing wrestling
Mixed martial artists utilizing judo
Japanese male judoka
Japanese male kickboxers
Heavyweight kickboxers
Japanese male professional wrestlers
People from Toyama Prefecture
Professional wrestling trainers